NK Hodošan is a Croatian football club based in the village of Hodošan in Donji Kraljevec municipality. Until 2006 club was known as Budućnost and under that name won Croatian third league in season 1996/97.

They finished second in the 1997–98 Croatian second league, but were relegated from the 1998–99 Croatian second division.

Hodošan currently play in the Međimurje County leagues, where they were undefeated in the autumn 2015 league.

References

Football clubs in Croatia
Football clubs in Međimurje County
Association football clubs established in 1965
1965 establishments in Croatia